Nick Kennedy-Hall (born 10 July 1989), better known by the stage name Anita Wigl'it, is a British and New Zealand drag performer best known for hosting House of Drag from 2018 to 2020, and competing on the first season of RuPaul's Drag Race Down Under in 2021. She competed in Canada's Drag Race: Canada vs. the World in 2022.

Early life 
Kennedy-Hall was born in Yeovil, England and moved to Auckland at age 10. He completed a Bachelor of Music and Bachelor of Music (Honours) in music performance (with first class honours) at University of Auckland and a Masters of Music degree at the University of British Columbia in Vancouver, British Columbia, before returning to New Zealand and joining the Royal New Zealand Navy Band as a trumpet player.

Career 
In 2018, Anita and Kita Mean were both judges on the New Zealand drag show House of Drag from 2018 to 2020, where they became known as the duo "Kita and Anita". The duo are also partners in Caluzzi, a drag cabaret in downtown Auckland.

In March 2021, both Anita and Kita were announced as contestants to compete on the first season of RuPaul's Drag Race Down Under. During the show, Anita won the Snatch Game in episode 2 for impersonating Queen Elizabeth II, and was eliminated in episode 4 after losing a lip sync to Karen from Finance.

Unlike a regular season of the original U.S. RuPaul's Drag Race, no Miss Congeniality was crowned by RuPaul in the series; however, a poll of the eliminated queens in post-show interviews with the entertainment website PopBuzz saw Anita Wigl'it named as their choice for Miss Congeniality.

She currently co-hosts the Kita and Anita's Happy Hour podcast alongside Kita Mean.

Filmography

Television

Web series

Discography

Featured singles

Awards and nominations

References

Living people
New Zealand drag queens
RuPaul's Drag Race Down Under contestants
1989 births
University of Auckland alumni
University of British Columbia School of Music alumni